Erman Şener (9 August 1942 in Afyon, Turkey – 29 March 2002 in Istanbul) was a Turkish film critic, screenwriter, author, columnist, TV host and producer.

Background
Şener was born in Afyon, Turkey. After he graduated from primary school his parents moved to Ankara. Just after a year in Ankara, Şener moved to Istanbul where he spend the rest of his life. He graduated from Istanbul University Economical and Commercial Sciences Institute and earned a master's degree in economics.

Career
When he was 16, he professionally started to write about cinema. He wrote for numerous leading magazines and newspapers like Ses, Yeni Sinema, Hayat Tarih, Hey, Hurriyet and Milliyet (for over 20 years). He worked as an instructor in Anatolian University (Cinema & TV) and Istanbul University (Graduate School of Journalism). Produced and hosted his own talk show Carsamba Sineması (Wednesday Cinema) on TRT 2 for more than 10 years. His articles concerning cinema and TV and their recent history were published in various Turkish and international newspapers and magazines. He was on the jury of some major international movie festivals.

Erman Şener died on March 29, 2002, at his house in Istanbul, after suffering from cirrhosis, at the age of 59. He is survived by his wife Emine and their two children Erdem and Elf.

Works 
 Yeşilçam ve Türk Sineması ("Yeşilçam and Turkish cinema"),
 Kurtuluş Savaşı ve Sinemamız ("Turkish War of Independence and our Cinema")
 Festivaller ("Festivals"),
 Sinema Seyircisinin El Kitabı ("Movie watcher's handbook")
 Televizyon ve Video ("Television and Video", 1984)
 Sinema Sanatçıları Sözlüğü ("Cinema Artists' Dictionary")
 Sinemaya Giriş ("Access to Cinema")
 Televizyona Giriş ("Access to Television")
 Hayatımız Buruşuk ("Our lives are wrinkled", humor, 1990)
 Demokratik Köfteler ("Democratic Meatballs", humor)

Notes

External links

Erman Şener info on the Turkish Ministry of Culture's website
 http://www.radikal.com.tr/haber.php?haberno=33374
 http://www.ntvmsnbc.com/news/143655.asp
 http://arama.hurriyet.com.tr/arsivnews.aspx?id=62840
 http://www.radikal.com.tr/haber.php?haberno=33375
 http://www.tumgazeteler.com/?a=768700
 http://www.intersinema.com/sinema-haberleri/haber_1169.asp
 http://www.bigglook.com/biggyazar1/makale7.asp
 http://10kbullets.com/reviews/kilink-vs-supermankilink-strip-and-kill/

1942 births
2002 deaths
Turkish journalists
Hürriyet people
Milliyet people
Istanbul University alumni
Deaths from cirrhosis
20th-century journalists